Stargate fandom is a community of people actively interested in the military science fiction film Stargate and its television shows including Stargate SG-1 (SG1), Stargate Infinity (SGI), Stargate Atlantis (SGA), Stargate Universe (SGU) and their spin offs. The first franchise release, Stargate (1994) spawned four television series successors, four movies (two in production), a plethora of merchandise, and a massive franchise collectively known as the Stargate (owned by Metro–Goldwyn–Mayer and aired by Syfy, which now owns television properties they previously held with Carolco Pictures).

Thanks to Stargate fandom, the franchise has spawned other media including books, television series, video games, comic books and audiobooks. These supplements to the film and series trilogies comprise another universe than the series and the film, and have resulted in significant development of the series' fictional universe. These media kept the franchise going in the interim between the film and series trilogies. In 2008, Stargate: The Ark of Truth and Continuum was released direct-to-DVD, which in total grossed over 21 million in the United States. In 2002, the franchise's first animated series, Stargate Infinity, was released as an introduction to the Expanded Universe. In 2004, Stargate Atlantis was released as a spin off from Stargate SG-1 and a new Stargate spin-off series entitled Stargate Universe was released in the fall of 2009.

Fandom 
While panned by critics, the 1994 film, Stargate drew much attention grossing close to 200 million USD. The film  was praised for its special effects and eventually gathered its own cult following over the years. The follow-up, Stargate television franchise has built a solid fanbase, the series has been known for its loyal fans. Stargate SG-1 has established many of its own conventions, such as Wolfcon in Europe and Gatecon in Canada among others. The franchise contains many unofficial conventions to such as MediaWest Con and Vividcon established and run by fans of the franchise. Since its early years, Stargate has grown in popularity in Great Britain, France and Germany among other European countries. The American written book, Reading Stargate SG-1 noted that the franchise was strong with female fans because of its feminist approach to certain characters, most notable Samantha Carter (portrayed by Amanda Tapping).

Gaters 

Brad Wright used the term "Gaters" to refer to fans of Stargate SG-1 in 2001, but the term did not become widespread. Some fans' belief that there was a real Stargate device under Cheyenne Mountain inspired writers Joseph Mallozzi and Paul Mullie to come up with their own conspiracy story for season 4's "Point of No Return". The fansite GateWorld became a major franchise news site with special arrangements with MGM; GateWorld's founder Darren Sumner was later hired to serve as a news editor for the official Stargate SG-1 magazine and to check Stargate comic books for continuity errors with the TV shows before publication. Late Night with Conan O'Brien graphic designer Pierre Bernard gained notoriety among Stargate fans for devoting several of his "Recliner of Rage" Late Night segments to SG-1. The producers invited him to make cameo appearances in the episodes "Zero Hour" and "200".

Gatecon 
Gatecon is an annual fan convention, which centers around the Stargate television franchise. Gatecon was conceived in 2000 to provide a place for fans of the show Stargate SG-1 to meet members of the cast and crew, and to get to know their fellow fans. The original organizers met due to an interactive Stargate-themed site run by Ryan Peters under Showtime's umbrella. Since its inception, Gatecon has raised money for the Make-a-Wish Foundation through a series of auction evenings. Metro–Goldwyn–Mayer (MGM) and Bridge Studios donated props and costumes. Because of the financial crisis, Gatecon decided to not hold any convention until 2010 in Vancouver, British Columbia, Canada. Gatecon's founder Allan Gowen said, "With the current world economic status it is making it harder and harder for people to attend conventions," as the reason why there is not going to be any Gatecon in 2009.

Until 2005, Gatecon was the main Stargate SG-1 fan convention. It was held in the Vancouver area, with more actor and crew member participation than other conventions. SG-1 conventions by Creation Entertainment were also marketed as "The Official Stargate SG-1 and Stargate Atlantis Tour", which mostly took place in the United States until Creation Entertainment acquired the license for Vancouver conventions in 2005. Wolf Events organized many SG-1 conventions in Europe, particularly in the UK and Germany.

GateWorld 

GateWorld (also known as GateWorld.net and abbreviated to GW) is an English-language fan-news site-based webpage for British-Canadian-American science fiction shows, but lays most its weight on the Stargate franchise. It was started in 1999 by Stargate SG-1 fan Darren Sumner, to be an online community for fans of the show. Through its relationship with Metro-Goldwyn-Mayer (MGM), GateWorld occasionally offers exclusive news reports such as the recurring appearance of Claudia Black in season nine of Stargate SG-1 and the announcement of the third Stargate live-action television series being in development and the casting of Brian J. Smith in this new show.

GateWorld has an extensive show encyclopedia, cast interviews, an online store, forum, articles, reviews as well as a large episode guides, with transcripts and pictures. The site also features up-to-date news. The GateWorld forum has more than 44,000 members and 9,100,000 posts. The record number of users online at the same time was 2,770 as of 10 May 2011, the day after the last episode of Stargate Universe aired.

History 
GateWorld was inaugurated on October 22, 1999 as "Starguide," a fan site that has changed addresses and servers many times since then. The site was developed by SG-1 fan, Darren Sumner to be an online community for the show Stargate SG-1, similar to web sites for other science fiction shows. Though the site focused on Stargate, other parts of the site were devoted to other sci-fi series in the form of episode guides. It was during this time that Starguide was given the new name GateWorld. The main site was completely redesigned in 2006 to coincide with the broadcast of Stargate SG-1s milestone 200th episode. With the cancellation of Stargate SG-1, Gateworld announced its support for SaveStargateSG1, a fan run campaign to get international networks and executives to show support for Stargate SG-1 and to help get it back on the air.

Although the webpage focus lay on news coverage and the episode guides, it also started to include a large encyclopedia, reviews and a store. Now, even the cast and producers of Stargate have contributed to the site with extensive multimedia interviews, blogs, spoilers, and live chats. The GateWorld Alpha Site is a site made by the creators of GateWorld. It was made in case of system problems with GateWorld, deeming it unable to connect to the site. The site provides news on problems and updates on site maintenance.

In 2007, GateWorld launched its Creation Storefront merchandise section, which includes DVDs, Stargate glassware, apparel, jewelry, photographs, autographs, keychains, and calendars available for purchase.

On January 4, 2008, GateWorld launched a new service called GateWorld Play, a Stargate video service similar to YouTube. Plans were to update this new channel "seven days per week for the foreseeable future".

Reception 
On June 9, 2006 Entertainment Weekly became the first major publication to recognize GateWorld. The Province called GateWorld "amazingly detailed". GateWorld was the winner of the 2007 SyFy Genre Awards for "Best Web Site". It was also nominated in 2006. The producers of the Stargate franchise are in good contact with GateWorld and have mentioned the website favorably in several audio commentaries. In 2004, Darren Sumner was invited to tour through the sets of Stargate Atlantis and to interview the members of the series' crew. Since then he and partner David Read make an annual pilgrimage to Vancouver, where the franchise is filmed, to visit the studio and interview the casts and crews of both shows for the Website. Producer Joseph Mallozzi stated in his blog:

Looking back on producing SG-1 season 5, Joseph Mallozzi also stated in 2011:

References

Notes

Bibliography

External links
 GateWorld at GateWorld.net
 Forum at GateWorld.net
 The Stargate Omnipedia at GateWorld.net
 Stargate Wiki at Wikia.com

Internet properties established in 1999
Science fiction fandom
Film and video fandom
Television fandom
Stargate